Kelvin Gastelum (born October 24, 1991) is an American professional mixed martial artist. He currently competes in the Middleweight division for the Ultimate Fighting Championship (UFC). Gastelum has competed for the UFC since he won The Ultimate Fighter 17. As of February 27, 2023, he is #15 in the UFC middleweight rankings.

Early life 
Gastelum is of Mexican descent. His family is from Obregon, Sonora, where he lived temporarily during his childhood.

Mixed martial arts career

Early career
Gastelum won a 5A Division II AIA state wrestling title out of Cibola High School and continued to wrestle at North Idaho College, where he was ranked as high as fifth in the country (NJCAA) as a freshman before deciding to compete in mixed martial arts professionally. He worked as a bail bondsman prior to training MMA full-time.

After turning professional, Gastelum amassed an undefeated record of five wins (all finishes) and no losses before competing in The Ultimate Fighter.

The Ultimate Fighter
In January 2013, it was announced that Gastelum was selected for The Ultimate Fighter: Team Jones vs. Team Sonnen. To get into the TUF house, Gastelum defeated Kito Andrews by decision. During the choosing of teams, he was picked last by coach Chael Sonnen for Team Sonnen.

Gastelum's next fight in the house was against Bubba McDaniel. He won in the second round via rear naked choke submission.

In the quarterfinals, Gastelum would take on Collin Hart. He won the fight by TKO in the first round.

In the semifinals, Gastelum fought Josh Samman. He won via first round rear naked choke, and advanced to the tournament finals.

Ultimate Fighting Championship

Gastelum faced teammate Uriah Hall in the finals at the Ultimate Fighter 17 Finale. Gastelum won the fight via split decision, becoming the youngest winner in the show's history at 21 years old and earned a UFC contract. After the victory, Gastelum announced he would be moving down a weight class to compete in the UFC's welterweight division.

Gastelum was expected to face Paulo Thiago on August 28, 2013, at UFC Fight Night 27. However, Thiago pulled out of the bout citing a knee injury and was replaced by Brian Melancon. Gastelum finished Melancon via rear naked choke in the first round.

Gastelum was expected to face Court McGee on December 14, 2013, at UFC on Fox 9, but was forced to withdraw due to a torn PCL.

Gastelum faced Rick Story on March 15, 2014, at UFC 171. He won the back-and-forth fight via split decision.

Gastelum faced Nico Musoke on June 28, 2014, at UFC Fight Night 44. Gastelum missed weight by one and three-quarter pounds and forfeited 20% of his fight purse to Musoke. He won the fight via unanimous decision.

Gastelum next fought Jake Ellenberger on November 15, 2014, at UFC 180 as the co-main event. He won the fight in the first round via rear-naked choke. The win also earned Gastelum his first Performance of the Night bonus award.

Gastelum next faced Tyron Woodley on January 31, 2015, at UFC 183. He missed weight by 10 lbs and was fined 30% of his fight purse which would be given to Woodley. He lost the fight via split decision. In the post-fight interview with Joe Rogan, Woodley said that he would not accept 30% of Gastelum's purse, as him missing weight and losing was enough punishment.

Due to Gastelum not being able to make weight on two occasions while fighting in the welterweight division in the UFC, UFC president Dana White ordered Gastelum to move up to middleweight. In his return to middleweight, Gastelum faced Nate Marquardt at UFC 188 on June 13, 2015. He won the fight via TKO after Marquardt's corner stopped the fight between the second and third round.

Gastelum was expected to face Matt Brown in a welterweight bout on November 21, 2015, at The Ultimate Fighter Latin America 2 Finale. However, Brown withdrew from the fight due to an ankle injury suffered in training. He was replaced by Neil Magny. Gastelum lost the fight by split decision. Both participants earned Fight of the Night honors.

Gastelum was scheduled to face Kyle Noke on January 2, 2016 at UFC 195, however, Gastelum pulled out due to a wrist injury and was replaced by Alex Morono.

Gastelum next faced Johny Hendricks on July 9, 2016 at UFC 200. He won the fight via unanimous decision.

Gastelum was expected to face Donald Cerrone at UFC 205 but, on the day of the weigh-ins, Gastelum did not make an attempt to formally make the 171 lb limit and the bout was scrapped. This made it the third time Gastelum failed to make the welterweight limit, prompting Dana White to say that he will "never let him fight at 170 again".

Gastelum returned to middleweight and faced Tim Kennedy on December 10, 2016 at UFC 206. He won the fight via TKO in the third round.

Gastelum next fought Vitor Belfort on March 11, 2017, in the main event at UFC Fight Night 106. He won the fight via TKO in the first round. The win also earned Gastelum a Performance of the Night bonus award.

Gastelum was expected to face Anderson Silva at UFC 212. However, he was pulled from the event after USADA learned he tested positive for high levels of marijuana metabolite Carboxy-Tetrahydrocannabinol (Carboxy-THC) above the 180 mL allowance by the World Anti-Doping Agency (WADA) from his previous drug test for his bout against Belfort. On May 7, Gastelum's win over Belfort was officially overturned to a "No Contest" and he was suspended 90 days (retroactive to the March 11 test date). The Performance of the Night which Gastelum had been awarded against Vitor Belfort was also rescinded.

Gastelum faced Chris Weidman on July 22, 2017, in the main event at UFC on Fox 25. Gastelum lost the fight via submission in the third round.

The bout with Anderson Silva was rescheduled and was expected to take place at a UFC Fight Night on November 25, 2017. However, Silva was pulled from the bout due to failing a USADA drug test and was replaced by Michael Bisping. Gastelum defeated Bisping by knockout in the first round. He also earned his second Performance of the Night bonus award.

Gastelum faced Ronaldo Souza on May 12, 2018, at UFC 224. He won the back and forth fight via split decision. Both combatants received the Fight of the Night bonus.

In July 2018, the UFC announced that Gastelum and Robert Whittaker were selected as coaches for Ultimate Fighter 28. On November 2, 2018, it was announced that Gastelum was scheduled to face Whittaker for the UFC Middleweight Championship on February 9, 2019, at UFC 234. However, Whittaker pulled out of the fight a few hours before the event and was forced to undergo emergency dual surgery later in the day due to an abdominal hernia of the intestine and a twisted and collapsed bowel.

Gastelum faced Israel Adesanya on April 13, 2019 at UFC 236 for the interim UFC Middleweight Championship. He lost the fight via unanimous decision in a back and forth fight. This fight earned him the Fight of the Night award, and was later voted the 2019 Fight of the Year by multiple MMA media outlets.

Gastelum faced Darren Till at UFC 244 in New York City, New York on November 2, 2019. Subsequent to the event's weigh-ins, the NYSAC issued a rare statement that they would be pursuing disciplinary action against Gastelum. Per the statement, the Athletic Commission stated upon review of Gastelum's weigh-in video that they "determined that Mr. Gastelum made contact with another person while on the scale, a violation of the weigh in policy. As the result, Gastelum and his coach, Rafael Cordeiro, were fined $1,000 and $200 respectively by New York State Athletic Commission. The official weight determination would not be disturbed, and Mr. Gastelum would not be disqualified from competing in UFC 244." He lost the fight via split decision. Gastelum was suspended by USADA for 9 months for testing positive for marijuana in relation to his bout with Darren Till at UFC 244 in November 2019 but the suspension was reduced to five months after Gastelum's successful completion of a drug treatment program.

Gastelum faced Jack Hermansson on July 19, 2020, at UFC Fight Night 172. He lost the fight via heel hook in round one.

Gastelum was scheduled to face Ian Heinisch on January 30, 2021, at UFC Fight Night 186. On December 26, 2020, it was announced that the bout had been moved to UFC 258 on February 13, 2021. Gastelum won the fight via unanimous decision.

Gastelum faced Robert Whittaker, replacing Paulo Costa, on April 17, 2021, at UFC on ESPN 22. Gastelum lost the fight via unanimous decision. This fight earned him the Fight of the Night award.

Gastelum faced Jared Cannonier on August 21, 2021, at UFC on ESPN 29. Gastelum lost the fight via unanimous decision.

Gastelum was scheduled to face Nassourdine Imavov on April 9, 2022, at UFC 273. However, Imavov was forced to withdraw due to visa issues and was replaced by Dricus du Plessis. However, Gastelum withdrew a week before the event due to an undisclosed injury and his bout with du Plessis was canceled. The fight was yet again rescheduled at UFC Fight Night 217 on January 14, 2023. However, the week of the event, Gastelum withdrew due to a mouth injury and was replaced by Sean Strickland in a light heavyweight bout.

Gastelum is scheduled to face  Chris Curtis on  April 8, 2023, at UFC 287.

Championships and accomplishments 
Ultimate Fighting Championship
The Ultimate Fighter 17 Winner
Fight of the Night (Four times) 
Performance of the Night (Three times) vs. Jake Ellenberger, Vitor Belfort and Michael Bisping
World MMA Awards
2014 Breakthrough Fighter of the Year
Wrestling Observer Newsletter
2019 MMA Match of the Year vs. Israel Adesanya (UFC 236, April 13)
MMAJunkie.com
2019 April Fight of the Month vs. Israel Adesanya
2019 Fight of the Year vs. Israel Adesanya
MMA Fighting
2019 Fight of the Year vs. Israel Adesanya
Cageside Press
2019 Fight of the Year vs. Israel Adesanya

Mixed martial arts record

|-
|Loss
|align=center|
|Jared Cannonier
|Decision (unanimous)
|UFC on ESPN: Cannonier vs. Gastelum 
|
|align=center|5
|align=center|5:00
|Las Vegas, Nevada, United States
|
|-
|Loss
|align=center|16–7 (1)
|Robert Whittaker
|Decision (unanimous)
|UFC on ESPN: Whittaker vs. Gastelum
|
|align=center|5
|align=center|5:00
|Las Vegas, Nevada, United States
|
|-
|Win
|align=center|16–6 (1)
|Ian Heinisch
|Decision (unanimous)
|UFC 258 
|
|align=center|3
|align=center|5:00
|Las Vegas, Nevada, United States
|
|-
|Loss
|align=center|15–6 (1)
|Jack Hermansson
|Submission (heel hook)
|UFC Fight Night: Figueiredo vs. Benavidez 2  
|
|align=center|1
|align=center|1:18
|Abu Dhabi, United Arab Emirates
|
|-
|Loss
|align=center|15–5 (1)
|Darren Till
|Decision (split)
|UFC 244 
|
|align=center|3
|align=center|5:00
|New York City, New York, United States
|  
|-
|Loss
|align=center|15–4 (1)
|Israel Adesanya
|Decision (unanimous)
|UFC 236
|
|align=center|5
|align=center|5:00
|Atlanta, Georgia, United States 
|
|-
|Win
|align=center|15–3 (1) 
|Ronaldo Souza
|Decision (split)
|UFC 224
|
|align=center|3
|align=center|5:00
|Rio de Janeiro, Brazil
|
|- 
|Win
|align=center|14–3 (1)
|Michael Bisping
|KO (punch)
|UFC Fight Night: Bisping vs. Gastelum
|
|align=center|1
|align=center|2:30
|Shanghai, China
|
|-
|Loss
|align=center|13–3 (1)
|Chris Weidman
|Submission (arm-triangle choke)
|UFC on Fox: Weidman vs. Gastelum 
|
|align=center|3
|align=center|3:45
|Uniondale, New York, United States
|
|-
|NC
|align=center|13–2 (1)
|Vitor Belfort
|NC (overturned)
|UFC Fight Night: Belfort vs. Gastelum
|
|align=center|1
|align=center|3:52
|Fortaleza, Brazil
|
|-
|Win
|align=center|13–2
|Tim Kennedy
|TKO (punches)
|UFC 206
|
|align=center|3
|align=center|2:45
|Toronto, Ontario, Canada
| 
|-
|Win
|align=center|12–2
|Johny Hendricks
|Decision (unanimous)
|UFC 200
|
|align=center|3
|align=center|5:00
|Las Vegas, Nevada, United States
|
|-
|Loss
|align=center|11–2
|Neil Magny
|Decision (split)
|The Ultimate Fighter Latin America II Finale: Magny vs. Gastelum
|
|align=center|5
|align=center|5:00
|Monterrey, Mexico
|
|-
|Win
|align=center|11–1
|Nate Marquardt
|TKO (corner stoppage) 
|UFC 188
|
|align=center|2
|align=center|5:00
|Mexico City, Mexico
|
|-
|Loss
|align=center|10–1
|Tyron Woodley
|Decision (split) 
|UFC 183
|
|align=center|3
|align=center|5:00
|Las Vegas, Nevada, United States
|
|-
|Win
|align=center|10–0
|Jake Ellenberger
| Submission (rear-naked choke)
|UFC 180
|
|align=center|1
|align=center|4:46
|Mexico City, Mexico
|
|-
|Win
|align=center|9–0
|Nico Musoke
|Decision (unanimous)
|UFC Fight Night: Swanson vs. Stephens
|
|align=center|3
|align=center|5:00
|San Antonio, Texas, United States
|
|-
|Win
|align=center|8–0
|Rick Story
|Decision (split)
|UFC 171
|
|align=center|3
|align=center|5:00
|Dallas, Texas, United States
|
|-
|Win
|align=center|7–0
|Brian Melancon
|Submission (rear-naked choke)
|UFC Fight Night: Condit vs. Kampmann II
|
|align=center|1
|align=center|2:26
|Indianapolis, Indiana, United States
|
|-
|Win
|align=center|6–0
|Uriah Hall
|Decision (split)
|The Ultimate Fighter: Team Jones vs. Team Sonnen Finale
|
|align=center|3
|align=center|5:00
|Las Vegas, Nevada, United States
|
|-
|Win
|align=center|5–0
|Mike Ashford
|TKO (punches)
|Rage in the Cage 161
|
|align=center|1
|align=center|1:57
|Chandler, Arizona, United States
|
|-
|Win
|align=center|4–0
|Bill Smallwood
|Submission (rear-naked choke)
|Cage Rage: On the River 2
|
|align=center|1
|align=center|0:56
|Parker, Arizona, United States
|
|-
|Win
|align=center|3–0
|Mike Gentile
|TKO (punches)
|Desert Rage Full Contact Fighting 10
|
|align=center|2
|align=center|2:32
|Yuma, Arizona, United States
|
|-
|Win
|align=center|2–0
|Yair Moguel
|Submission (kimura)
|Latin American Warriors 1: Heatwave
|
|align=center|3
|align=center|2:26
|Mexicali, Mexico
|
|-
|Win
|align=center|1–0
|Jose Sanchez
|TKO (submission to punches)
|Latin American Fighter 1: Border Wars
|
|align=center|2
|align=center|1:38
|Mexicali, Mexico
|
|-

Mixed martial arts exhibition record

|-
|Win
|align=center|4–0
|Josh Samman
|Submission (rear-naked choke)
|rowspan=4|The Ultimate Fighter: Team Jones vs. Team Sonnen
| (air date)
|align=center|1
|align=center|4:03
|rowspan=4|Las Vegas, Nevada, United States
|
|-
|Win
|align=center|3–0
|Collin Hart
|TKO (punches)
| (air date)
|align=center|1
|align=center|0:33
|
|-
|Win
|align=center|2–0
|Bubba McDaniel
|Submission (rear-naked choke) 
| (air date)
|align=center|2
|align=center|2:39
|
|-
|Win
|align=center|1–0
|Kito Andrews
|Decision (unanimous) 
| (air date)
|align=center|2
|align=center|5:00
|

See also
 List of current UFC fighters
 List of male mixed martial artists

References

External links
 
 

1991 births
Living people
Doping cases in mixed martial arts
American male mixed martial artists
Middleweight mixed martial artists
Mixed martial artists utilizing collegiate wrestling
Mixed martial artists utilizing Brazilian jiu-jitsu
American mixed martial artists of Mexican descent
Mixed martial artists from California
Mixed martial artists from Arizona
American sportspeople in doping cases
The Ultimate Fighter winners
People from Yuma, Arizona
Ultimate Fighting Championship male fighters
American practitioners of Brazilian jiu-jitsu
People awarded a black belt in Brazilian jiu-jitsu
American male sport wrestlers
North Idaho Cardinals wrestlers